Digna Sinke (born 17 October 1949) is a Dutch film director, producer and screenwriter. She has directed 13 films since 1972. Her 1984 film De stille Oceaan was entered into the 34th Berlin International Film Festival.

Selected filmography
 De stille Oceaan (1984)
 Above the Mountains (1992)
 Belle van Zuylen – Madame de Charrière (1993)

References

External links

1949 births
Living people
Dutch film directors
Dutch women film directors
Dutch women screenwriters
Dutch screenwriters
Dutch film producers
Dutch women film producers
People from Zonnemaire